Zolochiv Raion is a raion in Lviv Oblast in western Ukraine. Its administrative center is the city of Zolochiv. Population: . 

It was established in 1939.

On 18 July 2020, as part of the administrative reform of Ukraine, the number of raions of Lviv Oblast was reduced to seven, and the area of Zolochiv Raion was significantly expanded. Two abolished raions, Brody and Busk Raions, were merged into Zolochiv Raion. At the same time, part of Zolochiv Raion was transferred to Lviv Raion. The January 2020 estimate of the raion population was

Subdivisions

Current
After the reform in July 2020, the raion consisted of 7 hromadas:
 Brody urban hromada with the administration in the city of Brody, transferred from Brody Raion;
 Busk urban hromada with the administration in the city of Busk, transferred from Busk Raion;
 Krasne settlement hromada with the administration in the urban-type settlement of Krasne, transferred from Busk Raion;
 Pidkamin settlement hromada with the administration in the urban-type settlement of Pidkamin, transferred from Brody Raion;
 Pomoriany settlement hromada with the administration in the urban-type settlement of Pomoriany, retained from Zolochiv Raion;
 Zabolottsi rural hromada with the administration in the selo of Zabolottsi, transferred from Brody Raion;
 Zolochiv urban hromada with the administration in the city of Zolochiv, retained from Zolochiv Raion.

Before 2020

Before the 2020 reform, the raion consisted of three hromadas,
 Hlyniany urban hromada with the administration in the city of Hlyniany, transferred to Lviv Raion;
 Pomoriany settlement hromada with the administration in Pomoriany;
 Zolochiv urban hromada with the administration in Zolochiv.

See also
 Administrative divisions of Lviv Oblast

References

External links
 zolochiv.ridne.net 

 
Raions of Lviv Oblast
1939 establishments in Ukraine